Jesus ( AD 30 or 33), also referred to as Jesus Christ or Jesus of Nazareth (among other names and titles), was a first-century Jewish preacher and religious leader; he is the central figure of Christianity, the world's largest religion. Most Christians believe he is the incarnation of God the Son and the awaited Messiah (the Christ) prophesied in the Hebrew Bible.

Virtually all modern scholars of antiquity agree that Jesus existed historically. Accounts of Jesus' life are contained in the Gospels, especially the four canonical Gospels in the New Testament. Academic research has yielded uncertainty on the historical reliability of the Gospels and how closely they reflect the historical Jesus. Jesus was a Galilean Jew who was circumcised, was baptized by John the Baptist, began his own ministry, and was often referred to as "rabbi". Jesus debated with fellow Jews on how to best follow God, engaged in healings, taught in parables, and gathered followers. He was arrested and tried by the Jewish authorities, turned over to the Roman government, and crucified on the order of Pontius Pilate, the Roman prefect of Jerusalem. After his death, his followers believed he rose from the dead, and the community they formed eventually became the early Christian Church. Accounts of his teachings and life were initially conserved by oral transmission, which was the source of the written Gospels.

Christian theology includes the beliefs that Jesus was conceived by the Holy Spirit, was born of a virgin named Mary, performed miracles, founded the Christian Church, died by crucifixion as a sacrifice to achieve atonement for sin, rose from the dead, and ascended into Heaven, from where he will return. Commonly, Christians believe Jesus enables people to be reconciled to God. The Nicene Creed asserts that Jesus will judge the living and the dead, either before or after their bodily resurrection, an event tied to the Second Coming of Jesus in Christian eschatology. The great majority of Christians worship Jesus as the incarnation of God the Son, the second of three persons of the Trinity. The birth of Jesus is celebrated annually on 25 December as Christmas. His crucifixion is honored on Good Friday and his resurrection on Easter Sunday. The world's most widely used calendar era—in which the current year is AD  (or  CE)—is based on the approximate birthdate of Jesus.

Jesus is also revered in Baha'i faith, Druze faith, Islam and Manichaeism. In Islam, Jesus (often referred to by his Quranic name ) is considered the penultimate prophet of God and the messiah, who will return before the Day of Judgement. Muslims believe Jesus was born of the virgin Mary but was neither God nor a son of God. Most Muslims do not believe that he was killed or crucified but that God raised him into Heaven while he was still alive. In contrast, Judaism rejects the belief that Jesus was the awaited messiah, arguing that he did not fulfill messianic prophecies, and was neither divine nor resurrected.

Name

Naming convention, various names, connection to Joshua 
A typical Jew in Jesus' time had only one name, sometimes followed by the phrase "son of [father's name]", or the individual's hometown. Thus, in the New Testament, Jesus is commonly referred to as "Jesus of Nazareth". Jesus' neighbors in Nazareth refer to him as "the carpenter, the son of Mary and brother of James and Joses and Judas and Simon", "the carpenter's son", or "Joseph's son"; In the Gospel of John, the disciple Philip refers to him as "Jesus son of Joseph from Nazareth". The English name Jesus, from Greek Iesous, is a rendering of Joshua (Hebrew Yehoshua, later Yeshua), and was not uncommon in Judea at the time of the birth of Jesus. Yeshua/Yehoshua means "Yahweh is lordly", but popular etymology linked it to the verb meaning "save" and the noun "salvation", and the Gospel of Matthew tells of an angel that appeared to Joseph instructing him to name him Jesus because "he will save his people from their sins":

But after he had considered this, an angel of the Lord appeared to him in a dream and said, "Joseph son of David, do not be afraid to take Mary home as your wife, because what is conceived in her is from the Holy Spirit. She will give birth to a son, and you are to give him the name Jesus, because he will save his people from their sins."

Jesus Christ
Since the early period of Christianity, Christians have commonly referred to Jesus as "Jesus Christ".  The word Christ was a title or office ("the Christ"), not a given name. It derives from the Greek  (Christos), a translation of the Hebrew mashiakh meaning "anointed", and is usually transliterated into English as "messiah". In biblical Judaism, sacred oil was used to anoint certain exceptionally holy people and objects as part of their religious investiture.

Christians of the time designated Jesus as "the Christ" because they believed him to be the messiah, whose arrival is prophesied in the Hebrew Bible and Old Testament. In postbiblical usage, Christ became viewed as a name — one part of "Jesus Christ". Etymons of the term Christian (meaning a follower of Christ) have been in use since the 1st century.

Life and teachings in the New Testament

Canonical gospels
The four canonical gospels (Matthew, Mark, Luke, and John) are the foremost sources for the life and message of Jesus. But other parts of the New Testament also include references to key episodes in his life, such as the Last Supper in 1 Corinthians 11:23–26. Acts of the Apostles refers to Jesus' early ministry and its anticipation by John the Baptist. Acts 1:1–11 says more about the Ascension of Jesus than the canonical gospels do. In the undisputed Pauline letters, which were written earlier than the Gospels, Jesus' words or instructions are cited several times.

Some early Christian groups had separate descriptions of Jesus' life and teachings that are not in the New Testament. These include the Gospel of Thomas, Gospel of Peter, and Gospel of Judas, the Apocryphon of James, and many other apocryphal writings. Most scholars conclude that these were written much later and are less reliable accounts than the canonical gospels.

The canonical gospels are four accounts, each by a different author. The authors of the Gospels are all anonymous, attributed by tradition to the four evangelists, each with close ties to Jesus: Mark by John Mark, an associate of Peter; Matthew by one of Jesus' disciples; Luke by a companion of Paul mentioned in a few epistles; and John by another of Jesus' disciples, the "beloved disciple".

One important aspect of the study of the Gospels is the literary genre under which they fall. Genre "is a key convention guiding both the composition and the interpretation of writings". Whether the gospel authors set out to write novels, myths, histories, or biographies has a tremendous impact on how they ought to be interpreted. Some recent studies suggest that the genre of the Gospels ought to be situated within the realm of ancient biography. Although not without critics, the position that the Gospels are a type of ancient biography is the consensus among scholars today.

Concerning the accuracy of the accounts, viewpoints run the gamut from considering them inerrant descriptions of Jesus' life, to doubting whether they are historically reliable on a number of points, to considering them to provide very little historical information about his life beyond the basics. According to a broad scholarly consensus, the Synoptic Gospels (the first three—Matthew, Mark, and Luke) are the most reliable sources of information about Jesus.

According to the Marcan priority, the first to be written was the Gospel of Mark (written AD 60–75), followed by the Gospel of Matthew (AD 65–85), the Gospel of Luke (AD 65–95), and the Gospel of John (AD 75–100). Most scholars agree that the authors of Matthew and Luke used Mark as a source for their gospels. Since Matthew and Luke also share some content not found in Mark, many scholars assume that they used another source (commonly called the "Q source") in addition to Mark.

Matthew, Mark, and Luke are known as the Synoptic Gospels, from the Greek σύν (syn "together") and ὄψις (opsis "view"), because they are similar in content, narrative arrangement, language and paragraph structure, and one can easily set them next to each other and synoptically compare what is in them. Scholars generally agree that it is impossible to find any direct literary relationship between the Synoptic Gospels and the Gospel of John. While the flow of many events (e.g., Jesus' baptism, transfiguration, crucifixion and interactions with his apostles) are shared among the Synoptic Gospels, incidents such as the transfiguration and Jesus’ exorcizing demons do not appear in John, which also differs on other matters, such as the Cleansing of the Temple.

The Synoptics emphasize different aspects of Jesus. In Mark, Jesus is the Son of God whose mighty works demonstrate the presence of God's Kingdom. He is a tireless wonder worker, the servant of both God and man. This short gospel records few of Jesus' words or teachings. The Gospel of Matthew emphasizes that Jesus is the fulfillment of God's will as revealed in the Old Testament, and the Lord of the Church. He is the "Son of David", a "king", and the messiah. Luke presents Jesus as the divine-human savior who shows compassion to the needy. He is the friend of sinners and outcasts, come to seek and save the lost. This gospel includes well-known parables, such as the Good Samaritan and the Prodigal Son.

The prologue to the Gospel of John identifies Jesus as an incarnation of the divine Word (Logos). As the Word, Jesus was eternally present with God, active in all creation, and the source of humanity's moral and spiritual nature. Jesus is not only greater than any past human prophet but greater than any prophet could be. He not only speaks God's Word; he is God's Word. In the Gospel of John, Jesus reveals his divine role publicly. Here he is the Bread of Life, the Light of the World, the True Vine and more.

In general, the authors of the New Testament showed little interest in an absolute chronology of Jesus or in synchronizing the episodes of his life with the secular history of the age. As stated in John 21:25, the Gospels do not claim to provide an exhaustive list of the events in Jesus' life. The accounts were primarily written as theological documents in the context of early Christianity, with timelines as a secondary consideration. In this respect, it is noteworthy that the Gospels devote about one third of their text to the last week of Jesus' life in Jerusalem, referred to as the Passion. The Gospels do not provide enough details to satisfy the demands of modern historians regarding exact dates, but it is possible to draw from them a general picture of Jesus' life story.

Genealogy and nativity

Jesus was Jewish, born to Mary, wife of Joseph. The Gospels of Matthew and Luke offer two accounts of his genealogy. Matthew traces Jesus' ancestry to Abraham through David. Luke traces Jesus' ancestry through Adam to God. The lists are identical between Abraham and David, but differ radically from that point. Matthew has 27 generations from David to Joseph, whereas Luke has 42, with almost no overlap between the names on the two lists. Various theories have been put forward to explain why the two genealogies are so different.

Matthew and Luke each describe Jesus' birth, especially that Jesus was born to a virgin named Mary in Bethlehem in fulfillment of prophecy. Luke's account emphasizes events before the birth of Jesus and centers on Mary, while Matthew's mostly covers those after the birth and centers on Joseph. Both accounts state that Jesus was born to Joseph and Mary, his betrothed, in Bethlehem, and both support the doctrine of the virgin birth of Jesus, according to which Jesus was miraculously conceived by the Holy Spirit in Mary's womb when she was still a virgin. At the same time, there is evidence, at least in the Lukan Acts of the Apostles, that Jesus was thought to have had, like many figures in antiquity, a dual paternity, since there it is stated he descended from the seed or loins of David. By taking him as his own, Joseph will give him the necessary Davidic descent.

In Matthew, Joseph is troubled because Mary, his betrothed, is pregnant, but in the first of Joseph's four dreams an angel assures him not to be afraid to take Mary as his wife, because her child was conceived by the Holy Spirit. In Matthew 2:1–12, wise men or Magi from the East bring gifts to the young Jesus as the King of the Jews. They find him in a house in Bethlehem. Matthew focuses on an event after the Luke Nativity where Jesus was an infant. In Matthew Herod the Great hears of Jesus' birth and, wanting him killed, orders the murders of male infants in Bethlehem under age of 2. But an angel warns Joseph in his second dream, and the family flees to Egypt—later to return and settle in Nazareth.

In Luke 1:31–38, Mary learns from the angel Gabriel that she will conceive and bear a child called Jesus through the action of the Holy Spirit. When Mary is due to give birth, she and Joseph travel from Nazareth to Joseph's ancestral home in Bethlehem to register in the census ordered by Caesar Augustus. While there Mary gives birth to Jesus, and as they have found no room in the inn, she places the newborn in a manger. An angel announces the birth to a group of shepherds, who go to Bethlehem to see Jesus, and subsequently spread the news abroad. Luke 2:21 tells how Joseph and Mary have their baby circumcised on the eighth day after birth, and name him Jesus, as Gabriel had commanded Mary.

After the presentation of Jesus at the Temple, Joseph, Mary and Jesus return to Nazareth.

Early life, family, and profession

Jesus' childhood home is identified in the Gospels of Luke and Matthew as the town of Nazareth in Galilee, where he lived with his family. Although Joseph appears in descriptions of Jesus' childhood, no mention is made of him thereafter. His other family members—his mother, Mary, his brothers James, Joses (or Joseph), Judas and Simon and his unnamed sisters—are mentioned in the Gospels and other sources.

The Gospel of Mark reports that Jesus comes into conflict with his neighbors and family. Jesus' mother and brothers come to get him because people are saying that he is crazy. Jesus responds that his followers are his true family. In John, Mary follows Jesus to his crucifixion, and he expresses concern over her well-being.

Jesus is called a τέκτων (tektōn) in Mark 6:3, traditionally understood as carpenter but it could cover makers of objects in various materials, including builders. The Gospels indicate that Jesus could read, paraphrase, and debate scripture, but this does not necessarily mean that he received formal scribal training.

When Jesus is presented as a baby in the temple per Jewish Law, a man named Simeon says to Mary and Joseph that Jesus "shall stand as a sign of contradiction, while a sword will pierce your own soul. Then the secret thoughts of many will come to light." Several years later, when Jesus goes missing on a visit to Jerusalem, his parents find him in the temple sitting among the teachers, listening to them and asking questions, and the people are amazed at his understanding and answers; Mary scolds Jesus for going missing, to which Jesus replies that he must "be in his father's house".

Baptism and temptation

The Synoptic accounts of Jesus' baptism are all preceded by information about John the Baptist. They show John preaching penance and repentance for the remission of sins and encouraging the giving of alms to the poor as he baptizes people in the area of the Jordan River around Perea and foretells the arrival of someone "more powerful" than he. Later, Jesus identifies John as "the Elijah who was to come", the prophet who was expected to arrive before the "great and terrible day of the Lord". Likewise, Luke says that John had the spirit and power of Elijah.

In the Gospel of Mark, John the Baptist baptizes Jesus, and as he comes out of the water he sees the Holy Spirit descending to him like a dove and he hears a voice from heaven declaring him to be God's Son. This is one of two events described in the Gospels where a voice from Heaven calls Jesus "Son", the other being the Transfiguration. The spirit then drives him into the wilderness where he is tempted by Satan. Jesus then begins his ministry after John's arrest. Jesus' baptism in the Gospel of Matthew is similar. Here, before Jesus' baptism, John protests, saying, "I need to be baptized by you." Jesus instructs him to carry on with the baptism "to fulfill all righteousness". Matthew also details the three temptations that Satan offers Jesus in the wilderness. In the Gospel of Luke, the Holy Spirit descends as a dove after everyone has been baptized and Jesus is praying. John implicitly recognizes Jesus from prison after sending his followers to ask about him. Jesus' baptism and temptation serve as preparation for his public ministry.

The Gospel of John leaves out Jesus' baptism and temptation. Here, John the Baptist testifies that he saw the Spirit descend on Jesus. John publicly proclaims Jesus as the sacrificial Lamb of God, and some of John's followers become disciples of Jesus. In this Gospel, John denies that he is Elijah. Before John is imprisoned, Jesus leads his followers to baptize disciples as well, and they baptize more people than John.

Public ministry

The Synoptics depict two distinct geographical settings in Jesus' ministry. The first takes place north of Judea, in Galilee, where Jesus conducts a successful ministry, and the second shows Jesus rejected and killed when he travels to Jerusalem. Often referred to as "rabbi", Jesus preaches his message orally. Notably, Jesus forbids those who recognize him as the messiah to speak of it, including people he heals and demons he exorcises (see Messianic Secret).

John depicts Jesus' ministry as largely taking place in and around Jerusalem, rather than in Galilee; and Jesus' divine identity is openly proclaimed and immediately recognized.

Scholars divide the ministry of Jesus into several stages. The Galilean ministry begins when Jesus returns to Galilee from the Judaean Desert after rebuffing the temptation of Satan. Jesus preaches around Galilee, and in Matthew 4:18–20, his first disciples, who will eventually form the core of the early Church, encounter him and begin to travel with him. This period includes the Sermon on the Mount, one of Jesus' major discourses, as well as the calming of the storm, the feeding of the 5,000, walking on water and a number of other miracles and parables. It ends with the Confession of Peter and the Transfiguration.

As Jesus travels towards Jerusalem, in the Perean ministry, he returns to the area where he was baptized, about a third of the way down from the Sea of Galilee along the Jordan River. The final ministry in Jerusalem begins with Jesus' triumphal entry into the city on Palm Sunday. In the Synoptic Gospels, during that week Jesus drives the money changers from the Second Temple and Judas bargains to betray him. This period culminates in the Last Supper and the Farewell Discourse.

Disciples and followers

Near the beginning of his ministry, Jesus appoints twelve apostles. In Matthew and Mark, despite Jesus only briefly requesting that they join him, Jesus' first four apostles, who were fishermen, are described as immediately consenting, and abandoning their nets and boats to do so. In John, Jesus' first two apostles were disciples of John the Baptist. The Baptist sees Jesus and calls him the Lamb of God; the two hear this and follow Jesus. In addition to the Twelve Apostles, the opening of the passage of the Sermon on the Plain identifies a much larger group of people as disciples. Also, in Luke 10:1–16 Jesus sends 70 or 72 of his followers in pairs to prepare towns for his prospective visit. They are instructed to accept hospitality, heal the sick, and spread the word that the Kingdom of God is coming.

In Mark, the disciples are notably obtuse. They fail to understand Jesus' miracles, his parables, or what "rising from the dead" means. When Jesus is later arrested, they desert him.

Teachings and miracles

In the Synoptics, Jesus teaches extensively, often in parables, about the Kingdom of God (or, in Matthew, the Kingdom of Heaven). The Kingdom is described as both imminent and already present in the ministry of Jesus. Jesus promises inclusion in the Kingdom for those who accept his message. He talks of the "Son of Man", an apocalyptic figure who will come to gather the chosen.

Jesus calls people to repent their sins and to devote themselves completely to God. He tells his followers to adhere to Jewish law, although he is perceived by some to have broken the law himself, for example regarding the Sabbath. When asked what the greatest commandment is, Jesus replies: "You shall love the Lord your God with all your heart, and with all your soul, and with all your mind ... And a second is like it: 'You shall love your neighbor as yourself. Other ethical teachings of Jesus include loving your enemies, refraining from hatred and lust, turning the other cheek, and forgiving people who have sinned against you.

John's Gospel presents the teachings of Jesus not merely as his own preaching, but as divine revelation. John the Baptist, for example, states in John 3:34: "He whom God has sent speaks the words of God, for he gives the Spirit without measure." In John 7:16 Jesus says, "My teaching is not mine but his who sent me." He asserts the same thing in John 14:10: "Do you not believe that I am in the Father and the Father is in me? The words that I say to you I do not speak on my own; but the Father who dwells in me does his works."

Approximately 30 parables form about one-third of Jesus' recorded teachings. The parables appear within longer sermons and at other places in the narrative. They often contain symbolism, and usually relate the physical world to the spiritual. Common themes in these tales include the kindness and generosity of God and the perils of transgression. Some of his parables, such as the Prodigal Son, are relatively simple, while others, such as the Growing Seed, are sophisticated, profound and abstruse. When asked by his disciples why he speaks in parables to the people, Jesus replies that the chosen disciples have been given to "know the secrets of the kingdom of heaven", unlike the rest of their people, "For the one who has will be given more and he will have in abundance. But the one who does not have will be deprived even more", going on to say that the majority of their generation have grown "dull hearts" and thus are unable to understand.

In the gospel accounts, Jesus devotes a large portion of his ministry by performing miracles, especially healings. The miracles can be classified into two main categories: healing miracles and nature miracles. The healing miracles include cures for physical ailments, exorcisms, and resurrections of the dead. The nature miracles show Jesus' power over nature, and include turning water into wine, walking on water, and calming a storm, among others. Jesus states that his miracles are from a divine source. When his opponents suddenly accuse him of performing exorcisms by the power of Beelzebul, the prince of demons, Jesus counters that he performs them by the "Spirit of God" (Matthew 12:28) or "finger of God", arguing that all logic suggests that Satan would not let his demons assist the Children of God because it would divide Satan's house and bring his kingdom to desolation; furthermore, he asks his opponents that if he exorcises by Beel'zebub, "by whom do your sons cast them out?" In Matthew 12:31–32, he goes on to say that while all manner of sin, "even insults against God" or "insults against the son of man", shall be forgiven, whoever insults goodness (or "The Holy Spirit") shall never be forgiven; they carry the guilt of their sin forever.

In John, Jesus' miracles are described as "signs", performed to prove his mission and divinity. In the Synoptics, when asked by some teachers of the Law and some Pharisees to give miraculous signs to prove his authority, Jesus refuses, saying that no sign shall come to corrupt and evil people except the sign of the prophet Jonah. Also, in the Synoptic Gospels, the crowds regularly respond to Jesus' miracles with awe and press on him to heal their sick. In John's Gospel, Jesus is presented as unpressured by the crowds, who often respond to his miracles with trust and faith. One characteristic shared among all miracles of Jesus in the gospel accounts is that he performed them freely and never requested or accepted any form of payment. The gospel episodes that include descriptions of the miracles of Jesus also often include teachings, and the miracles themselves involve an element of teaching. Many of the miracles teach the importance of faith. In the cleansing of ten lepers and the raising of Jairus's daughter, for instance, the beneficiaries are told that their healing was due to their faith.

Proclamation as Christ and Transfiguration

At about the middle of each of the three Synoptic Gospels are two significant events: the Confession of Peter and the Transfiguration of Jesus. These two events are not mentioned in the Gospel of John.

In his Confession, Peter tells Jesus, "You are the Messiah, the Son of the living God." Jesus affirms that Peter's confession is divinely revealed truth. After the confession, Jesus tells his disciples about his upcoming death and resurrection.

In the Transfiguration, Jesus takes Peter and two other apostles up an unnamed mountain, where "he was transfigured before them, and his face shone like the sun, and his clothes became dazzling white." A bright cloud appears around them, and a voice from the cloud says, "This is my Son, the Beloved; with him I am well pleased; listen to him."

Passion Week
The description of the last week of the life of Jesus (often called Passion Week) occupies about one-third of the narrative in the canonical gospels, starting with Jesus' triumphal entry into Jerusalem and ending with his Crucifixion.

Activities in Jerusalem

In the Synoptics, the last week in Jerusalem is the conclusion of the journey through Perea and Judea that Jesus began in Galilee. Jesus rides a young donkey into Jerusalem, reflecting the tale of the Messiah's Donkey, an oracle from the Book of Zechariah in which the Jews' humble king enters Jerusalem this way. People along the way lay cloaks and small branches of trees (known as palm fronds) in front of him and sing part of Psalms 118:25-26.

Jesus next expels the money changers from the Second Temple, accusing them of turning it into a den of thieves through their commercial activities. He then prophecies about the coming destruction, including false prophets, wars, earthquakes, celestial disorders, persecution of the faithful, the appearance of an "abomination of desolation", and unendurable tribulations. The mysterious "Son of Man", he says, will dispatch angels to gather the faithful from all parts of the earth. Jesus warns that these wonders will occur in the lifetimes of the hearers. In John, the Cleansing of the Temple occurs at the beginning of Jesus' ministry instead of at the end.

Jesus comes into conflict with the Jewish elders, such as when they question his authority and when he criticizes them and calls them hypocrites. Judas Iscariot, one of the twelve apostles, secretly strikes a bargain with the Jewish elders, agreeing to betray Jesus to them for 30 silver coins.

The Gospel of John recounts of two other feasts in which Jesus taught in Jerusalem before the Passion Week. In Bethany, a village near Jerusalem, Jesus raises Lazarus from the dead. This potent sign increases the tension with authorities, who conspire to kill him. Mary of Bethany anoints Jesus' feet, foreshadowing his entombment. Jesus then makes his Messianic entry into Jerusalem.
The cheering crowds greeting Jesus as he enters Jerusalem add to the animosity between him and the establishment. In John, Jesus has already cleansed the Second Temple during an earlier Passover visit to Jerusalem. John next recounts Jesus' Last Supper with his disciples.

Last Supper

The Last Supper is the final meal that Jesus shares with his twelve apostles in Jerusalem before his crucifixion. The Last Supper is mentioned in all four canonical gospels; Paul's First Epistle to the Corinthians also refers to it. During the meal, Jesus predicts that one of his apostles will betray him. Despite each Apostle's assertion that he would not betray him, Jesus reiterates that the betrayer would be one of those present. Matthew 26:23–25 and John 13:26–27 specifically identify Judas as the traitor.

In the Synoptics, Jesus takes bread, breaks it, and gives it to the disciples, saying, "This is my body, which is given for you". He then has them all drink from a cup, saying, "This cup that is poured out for you is the new covenant in my blood," The Christian sacrament or ordinance of the Eucharist is based on these events. Although the Gospel of John does not include a description of the bread-and-wine ritual during the Last Supper, most scholars agree that John 6:22–59 (the Bread of Life Discourse) has a eucharistic character and resonates with the institution narratives in the Synoptic Gospels and in the Pauline writings on the Last Supper.

In all four gospels, Jesus predicts that Peter will deny knowledge of him three times before the rooster crows the next morning. In Luke and John, the prediction is made during the Supper. In Matthew and Mark, the prediction is made after the Supper; Jesus also predicts that all his disciples will desert him. The Gospel of John provides the only account of Jesus washing his disciples' feet after the meal. John also includes a long sermon by Jesus, preparing his disciples (now without Judas) for his departure. Chapters 14–17 of the Gospel of John are known as the Farewell Discourse and are a significant source of Christological content.

Agony in the Garden, betrayal, and arrest

In the Synoptics, Jesus and his disciples go to the garden Gethsemane, where Jesus prays to be spared his coming ordeal. Then Judas comes with an armed mob, sent by the chief priests, scribes and elders. He kisses Jesus to identify him to the crowd, which then arrests Jesus. In an attempt to stop them, an unnamed disciple of Jesus uses a sword to cut off the ear of a man in the crowd. After Jesus' arrest, his disciples go into hiding, and Peter, when questioned, thrice denies knowing Jesus. After the third denial, Peter hears the rooster crow and recalls Jesus' prediction about his denial. Peter then weeps bitterly.

In John 18:1–11, Jesus does not pray to be spared his crucifixion, as the gospel portrays him as scarcely touched by such human weakness. The people who arrest him are Roman soldiers and Temple guards. Instead of being betrayed by a kiss, Jesus proclaims his identity, and when he does, the soldiers and officers fall to the ground. The gospel identifies Peter as the disciple who used the sword, and Jesus rebukes him for it.

Trials by the Sanhedrin, Herod, and Pilate

After his arrest, Jesus is taken late at night to the private residence of the high priest, Caiaphas, who had been installed by Pilate's predecessor, the Roman procurator Valerius Gratus. The Sanhedrin was a Jewish judicial body, The gospel accounts differ on the details of the trials. In Matthew 26:57, Mark 14:53 and Luke 22:54, Jesus is taken to the house of the high priest, Caiaphas, where he is mocked and beaten that night. Early the next morning, the chief priests and scribes lead Jesus away into their council. John 18:12–14 states that Jesus is first taken to Annas, Caiaphas's father-in-law, and then to the high priest.

During the trials Jesus speaks very little, mounts no defense, and gives very infrequent and indirect answers to the priests' questions, prompting an officer to slap him. In Matthew 26:62, Jesus' unresponsiveness leads Caiaphas to ask him, "Have you no answer?" In Mark 14:61 the high priest then asks Jesus, "Are you the Messiah, the Son of the Blessed One?" Jesus replies, "I am", and then predicts the coming of the Son of Man. This provokes Caiaphas to tear his own robe in anger and to accuse Jesus of blasphemy. In Matthew and Luke, Jesus' answer is more ambiguous: in Matthew 26:64 he responds, "You have said so", and in Luke 22:70 he says, "You say that I am".

The Jewish elders take Jesus to Pilate's Court and ask the Roman governor, Pontius Pilate, to judge and condemn Jesus for various allegations: subverting the nation, opposing the payment of tribute, claiming to be Christ, a King, and claiming to be the son of God. The use of the word "king" is central to the discussion between Jesus and Pilate. In John 18:36 Jesus states, "My kingdom is not from this world", but he does not unequivocally deny being the King of the Jews. In Luke 23:7–15, Pilate realizes that Jesus is a Galilean, and thus comes under the jurisdiction of Herod Antipas, the Tetrarch of Galilee and Perea. Pilate sends Jesus to Herod to be tried, but Jesus says almost nothing in response to Herod's questions. Herod and his soldiers mock Jesus, put an expensive robe on him to make him look like a king, and return him to Pilate, who then calls together the Jewish elders and announces that he has "not found this man guilty".

Observing a Passover custom of the time, Pilate allows one prisoner chosen by the crowd to be released. He gives the people a choice between Jesus and a murderer called Barabbas ( or Bar-abbâ, "son of the father", from the common given name Abba: 'father'). Persuaded by the elders, the mob chooses to release Barabbas and crucify Jesus. Pilate writes a sign in Hebrew, Latin, and Greek that reads "Jesus of Nazareth, the King of the Jews" (abbreviated as INRI in depictions) to be affixed to Jesus' cross, then scourges Jesus and sends him to be crucified. The soldiers place a crown of thorns on Jesus' head and ridicule him as the King of the Jews. They beat and taunt him before taking him to Calvary, also called Golgotha, for crucifixion.

Crucifixion and entombment

Jesus' crucifixion is described in all four canonical gospels. After the trials, Jesus is led to Calvary carrying his cross; the route traditionally thought to have been taken is known as the Via Dolorosa. The three Synoptic Gospels indicate that Simon of Cyrene assists him, having been compelled by the Romans to do so. In Luke 23:27–28, Jesus tells the women in the multitude of people following him not to weep for him but for themselves and their children. At Calvary, Jesus is offered a sponge soaked in a concoction usually offered as a painkiller. According to Matthew and Mark, he refuses it.

The soldiers then crucify Jesus and cast lots for his clothes. Above Jesus' head on the cross is Pilate's inscription, "Jesus of Nazareth, the King of the Jews". Soldiers and passersby mock him about it. Two convicted thieves are crucified along with Jesus. In Matthew and Mark, both thieves mock Jesus. In Luke, one of them rebukes Jesus, while the other defends him. Jesus tells the latter: "today you will be with me in Paradise." In John, Mary, the mother of Jesus, and the beloved disciple were at the crucifixion. Jesus tells the beloved disciple to take care of his mother.

The Roman soldiers break the two thieves' legs (a procedure designed to hasten death in a crucifixion), but they do not break those of Jesus, as he is already dead (John 19:33). In John 19:34, one soldier pierces Jesus' side with a lance, and blood and water flow out. In the Synoptics, when Jesus dies, the heavy curtain at the Temple is torn. In Matthew 27:51–54, an earthquake breaks open tombs. In Matthew and Mark, terrified by the events, a Roman centurion states that Jesus was the Son of God.

On the same day, Joseph of Arimathea, with Pilate's permission and with Nicodemus's help, removes Jesus' body from the cross, wraps him in a clean cloth, and buries him in his new rock-hewn tomb. In Matthew 27:62–66, on the following day the chief Jewish priests ask Pilate for the tomb to be secured, and with Pilate's permission the priests place seals on the large stone covering the entrance.

Resurrection and ascension

Mary Magdalene (alone in the Gospel of John, but accompanied by other women in the Synoptics) goes to Jesus' tomb on Sunday morning and is surprised to find it empty. Despite Jesus' teaching, the disciples had not understood that Jesus would rise again.

In Matthew 28, there are guards at the tomb. An angel descends from Heaven, and opens the tomb. The guards faint from fear. Jesus appears to Mary Magdalene and "the other Mary" after they visited the tomb. Jesus then appears to the eleven remaining disciples in Galilee and commissions them to baptize all nations in the name of the Father, Son and Holy Spirit, "teaching them to obey everything that I have commanded you."
In Mark 16, Salome and Mary, mother of James are with Mary Magdalene. In the tomb, a young man in a white robe (an angel) tells them that Jesus will meet his disciples in Galilee, as he had told them (referring to Mark 14:28).
In Luke, Mary and various other women meet two angels at the tomb, but the eleven disciples do not believe their story. Jesus appears to two of his followers in Emmaus. He also makes an appearance to Peter. Jesus then appears that same day to his disciples in Jerusalem. Although he appears and vanishes mysteriously, he also eats and lets them touch him to prove that he is not a spirit. He repeats his command to bring his teaching to all nations.
In John, Mary is alone at first, but Peter and the beloved disciple come and see the tomb as well. Jesus then appears to Mary at the tomb. He later appears to the disciples, breathes on them, and gives them the power to forgive and retain sins. In a second visit to disciples, he proves to a doubting disciple ("Doubting Thomas") that he is flesh and blood. The disciples return to Galilee, where Jesus makes another appearance. He performs a miracle known as the catch of 153 fish at the Sea of Galilee, after which Jesus encourages Peter to serve his followers.

Jesus' ascension into Heaven is described in Luke 24:50–53, Acts 1:1–11 and mentioned in 1 Timothy 3:16. In the Acts of the Apostles, forty days after the Resurrection, as the disciples look on, "he was lifted up, and a cloud took him out of their sight". 1 Peter 3:22 states that Jesus has "gone into heaven and is at the right hand of God".

The Acts of the Apostles describes several appearances of Jesus after his Ascension. In Acts 7:55, Stephen gazes into heaven and sees "Jesus standing at the right hand of God" just before his death. On the road to Damascus, the Apostle Paul is converted to Christianity after seeing a blinding light and hearing a voice saying, "I am Jesus, whom you are persecuting." In Acts 9:10–18, Jesus instructs Ananias of Damascus in a vision to heal Paul. The Book of Revelation includes a revelation from Jesus concerning the last days of Earth.

Early Christianity

After Jesus' life, his followers, as described in the first chapters of the Acts of the Apostles, were all Jews either by birth or conversion, for which the biblical term "proselyte" is used, and referred to by historians as Jewish Christians. The early Gospel message was spread orally, probably in Aramaic, but almost immediately also in Greek. The New Testament's Acts of the Apostles and Epistle to the Galatians record that the first Christian community was centered in Jerusalem and its leaders included Peter, James, the brother of Jesus, and John the Apostle.

After the conversion of Paul the Apostle, he claimed the title of "Apostle to the Gentiles". Paul's influence on Christian thinking is said to be more significant than that of any other New Testament author. By the end of the 1st century, Christianity began to be recognized internally and externally as a separate religion from Judaism which itself was refined and developed further in the centuries after the destruction of the Second Temple.

Numerous quotations in the New Testament and other Christian writings of the first centuries, indicate that early Christians generally used and revered the Hebrew Bible (the Tanakh) as religious text, mostly in the Greek (Septuagint) or Aramaic (Targum) translations.

Early Christians wrote many religious works, including the ones included in the canon of the New Testament. The canonical texts, which have become the main sources used by historians to try to understand the historical Jesus and sacred texts within Christianity, were probably written between 50 and 120 AD.

Historical views

Prior to the Enlightenment, the Gospels were usually regarded as accurate historical accounts, but since then scholars have emerged who question the reliability of the Gospels and draw a distinction between the Jesus described in the Gospels and the Jesus of history. Since the 18th century, three separate scholarly quests for the historical Jesus have taken place, each with distinct characteristics and based on different research criteria, which were often developed during the quest that applied them. While there is widespread scholarly agreement on the existence of Jesus, and a basic consensus on the general outline of his life, the portraits of Jesus constructed by various scholars often differ from each other, and from the image portrayed in the gospel accounts.

Approaches to the historical reconstruction of the life of Jesus have varied from the "maximalist" approaches of the 19th century, in which the gospel accounts were accepted as reliable evidence wherever it is possible, to the "minimalist" approaches of the early 20th century, where hardly anything about Jesus was accepted as historical. In the 1950s, as the second quest for the historical Jesus gathered pace, the minimalist approaches faded away, and in the 21st century, minimalists such as Price are a very small minority. Although a belief in the inerrancy of the Gospels cannot be supported historically, many scholars since the 1980s have held that, beyond the few facts considered to be historically certain, certain other elements of Jesus' life are "historically probable". Modern scholarly research on the historical Jesus thus focuses on identifying the most probable elements.

Judea and Galilee in the 1st century

In AD 6, Judea, Idumea, and Samaria were transformed from a Herodian client kingdom of the Roman Empire into an imperial province, also called Judea. A Roman prefect, rather than a client king, ruled the land. The prefect ruled from Caesarea Maritima, leaving Jerusalem to be run by the High Priest of Israel. As an exception, the prefect came to Jerusalem during religious festivals, when religious and patriotic enthusiasm sometimes inspired unrest or uprisings. Gentile lands surrounded the Jewish territories of Judea and Galilee, but Roman law and practice allowed Jews to remain separate legally and culturally. Galilee was evidently prosperous, and poverty was limited enough that it did not threaten the social order. 

This was the era of Hellenistic Judaism, which combined Jewish religious tradition with elements of Hellenistic Greek culture. Until the fall of the Western Roman Empire and the Muslim conquests of the Eastern Mediterranean, the main centers of Hellenistic Judaism were Alexandria (Egypt) and Antioch (now Southern Turkey), the two main Greek urban settlements of the Middle East and North Africa area, both founded at the end of the 4th century BCE in the wake of the conquests of Alexander the Great. Hellenistic Judaism also existed in Jerusalem during the Second Temple Period, where there was conflict between Hellenizers and traditionalists (sometimes called Judaizers). The Hebrew Bible was translated from Biblical Hebrew and Biblical Aramaic into Jewish Koine Greek; the Targum translations into Aramaic were also generated during this era, both due to the decline of knowledge of Hebrew.

Jews based their faith and religious practice on the Torah, five books said to have been given by God to Moses. The three prominent religious parties were the Pharisees, the Essenes, and the Sadducees. Together these parties represented only a small fraction of the population. Most Jews looked forward to a time that God would deliver them from their pagan rulers, possibly through war against the Romans.

Sources

New Testament scholars face a formidable challenge when they analyze the canonical Gospels.
The Gospels are not biographies in the modern sense, and the authors explain Jesus' theological significance and recount his public ministry while omitting many details of his life.
The reports of supernatural events associated with Jesus' death and resurrection make the challenge even more difficult.
Scholars regard the Gospels as compromised sources of information because the writers were trying to glorify Jesus.
Even so, the sources for Jesus' life are better than sources scholars have for the life of Alexander the Great.
Scholars use a number of criteria, such as the criterion of independent attestation, the criterion of coherence, and the criterion of discontinuity to judge the historicity of events. The historicity of an event also depends on the reliability of the source; indeed, the Gospels are not independent nor consistent records of Jesus' life. Mark, which is most likely the earliest written gospel, has been considered for many decades the most historically accurate. John, the latest written gospel, differs considerably from the Synoptic Gospels, and thus is generally considered less reliable, although more and more scholars now also recognize that it may contain a core of older material as historically valuable as the Synoptic tradition or even more so.

Some scholars (most notably the Jesus Seminar) believe that the non-canonical Gospel of Thomas might be an independent witness to many of Jesus' parables and aphorisms. For example, Thomas confirms that Jesus blessed the poor and that this saying circulated independently before being combined with similar sayings in the Q source. However, the majority of scholars are skeptical about this text and believe it should be dated to the 2nd century CE instead.

Other select non-canonical Christian texts may also have value for historical Jesus research.

Early non-Christian sources that attest to the historical existence of Jesus include the works of the historians Josephus and Tacitus. Josephus scholar Louis Feldman has stated that "few have doubted the genuineness" of Josephus's reference to Jesus in book 20 of the Antiquities of the Jews, and it is disputed only by a small number of scholars. Tacitus referred to Christ and his execution by Pilate in book 15 of his work Annals. Scholars generally consider Tacitus's reference to the execution of Jesus to be both authentic and of historical value as an independent Roman source.

Non-Christian sources are valuable in two ways. First, they show that even neutral or hostile parties never show any doubt that Jesus actually existed. Second, they present a rough picture of Jesus that is compatible with that found in the Christian sources: that Jesus was a teacher, had a reputation as a miracle worker, had a brother James, and died a violent death.

Archaeology helps scholars better understand Jesus' social world. Recent archaeological work, for example, indicates that Capernaum, a city important in Jesus' ministry, was poor and small, without even a forum or an agora. This archaeological discovery resonates well with the scholarly view that Jesus advocated reciprocal sharing among the destitute in that area of Galilee.

Chronology

Jesus was a Galilean Jew, born around the beginning of the 1st century, who died in 30 or 33 AD in Judea. The general scholarly consensus is that Jesus was a contemporary of John the Baptist and was crucified as ordered by the Roman governor Pontius Pilate, who held office from 26 to 36 AD.

The Gospels offer several indications concerning the year of Jesus' birth. Matthew 2:1 associates the birth of Jesus with the reign of Herod the Great, who died around 4 BC, and Luke 1:5 mentions that Herod was on the throne shortly before the birth of Jesus, although this gospel also associates the birth with the Census of Quirinius which took place ten years later. Luke 3:23 states that Jesus was "about thirty years old" at the start of his ministry, which according to Acts 10:37–38 was preceded by John the Baptist's ministry, which was recorded in Luke 3:1–2 to have begun in the 15th year of Tiberius's reign (28 or 29 AD). By collating the gospel accounts with historical data and using various other methods, most scholars arrive at a date of birth for Jesus between 6 and 4 BC, but some propose estimates that include a wider range.

The date range for Jesus' ministry has been estimated using several different approaches. One of these applies the reference in Luke 3:1–2, Acts 10:37–38, and the dates of Tiberius's reign, which are well known, to give a date of around 28–29 AD for the start of Jesus' ministry. Another approach estimates a date around 27–29 AD by using the statement about the temple in John 2:13–20, which asserts that the temple in Jerusalem was in its 46th year of construction at the start of Jesus' ministry, together with Josephus's statement that the temple's reconstruction was started by Herod the Great in the 18th year of his reign. A further method uses the date of the death of John the Baptist and the marriage of Herod Antipas to Herodias, based on the writings of Josephus, and correlates it with Matthew 14:4 and Mark 6:18. Given that most scholars date the marriage of Herod and Herodias as AD 28–35, this yields a date about 28–29 AD.

A number of approaches have been used to estimate the year of the crucifixion of Jesus. Most scholars agree that he died in 30 or 33 AD. The Gospels state that the event occurred during the prefecture of Pilate, the Roman governor of Judea from 26 to 36 AD. The date for the conversion of Paul (estimated to be 33–36 AD) acts as an upper bound for the date of Crucifixion. The dates for Paul's conversion and ministry can be determined by analyzing the Pauline epistles and the Acts of the Apostles. Astronomers have tried to estimate the precise date of the Crucifixion by analyzing lunar motion and calculating historic dates of Passover, a festival based on the lunisolar Hebrew calendar. The most widely accepted dates derived from this method are 7 April 30 AD, and 3 April 33 AD (both Julian).

Historicity of events

Nearly all historical scholars agree that Jesus was a real person who historically existed. Scholars have reached a limited consensus on the basics of Jesus' life.

Family

Many scholars agree that Joseph, Jesus' father, died before Jesus began his ministry. Joseph is not mentioned at all in the Gospels during Jesus' ministry. Joseph's death would explain why in Mark 6:3, Jesus' neighbors refer to Jesus as the "son of Mary" (sons were usually identified by their fathers).

According to Theissen and Merz, it is common for extraordinary charismatic leaders, such as Jesus, to come into conflict with their ordinary families. In Mark, Jesus' family comes to get him, fearing that he is mad (Mark 3:20–34), and this account is thought to be historical because early Christians would likely not have invented it. After Jesus' death, many members of his family joined the Christian movement. Jesus' brother James became a leader of the Jerusalem Church.

Géza Vermes says that the doctrine of the virgin birth of Jesus arose from theological development rather than from historical events.
Despite the widely held view that the authors of the Synoptic Gospels drew upon each other (the so-called synoptic problem), other scholars take it as significant that the virgin birth is attested by two separate gospels, Matthew and Luke.

According to E. P. Sanders, the birth narratives in the Gospel of Matthew and the Gospel of Luke are the clearest case of invention in the Gospel narratives of Jesus' life. Both accounts have Jesus born in Bethlehem, in accordance with Jewish salvation history, and both have him growing up in Nazareth. But Sanders points that the two Gospels report completely different and irreconcilable explanations for how that happened. Luke's account of a census in which everyone returned to their ancestral cities is not plausible. Matthew's account is more plausible, but the story reads as though it was invented to identify Jesus as like a new Moses, and the historian Josephus reports Herod the Great's brutality without ever mentioning that he massacred little boys. The contradictions between the two Gospels was probably apparent to the early Christians already, since attempts to harmonize the two narratives are already present in the earlier apocryphal infancy gospels (the Infancy Gospel of Thomas and the Gospel of James), which are dated to the 2nd century CE.

Sanders says that the genealogies of Jesus are based not on historical information but on the authors' desire to show that Jesus was the universal Jewish savior. In any event, once the doctrine of the virgin birth of Jesus became established, that tradition superseded the earlier tradition that he was descended from David through Joseph. The Gospel of Luke reports that Jesus was a blood relative of John the Baptist, but scholars generally consider this connection to be invented.

Baptism

Most modern scholars consider Jesus' baptism to be a definite historical fact, along with his crucifixion. Theologian James D. G. Dunn states that they "command almost universal assent" and "rank so high on the 'almost impossible to doubt or deny' scale of historical facts" that they are often the starting points for the study of the historical Jesus. Scholars adduce the criterion of embarrassment, saying that early Christians would not have invented a baptism that might imply that Jesus committed sins and wanted to repent. According to Theissen and Merz, Jesus was inspired by John the Baptist and took over from him many elements of his teaching.

Ministry in Galilee
Most scholars hold that Jesus lived in Galilee and Judea and did not preach or study elsewhere. They agree that Jesus debated with Jewish authorities on the subject of God, performed some healings, taught in parables and gathered followers. Jesus' Jewish critics considered his ministry to be scandalous because he feasted with sinners, fraternized with women, and allowed his followers to pluck grain on the Sabbath. According to Sanders, it is not plausible that disagreements over how to interpret the Law of Moses and the Sabbath would have led Jewish authorities to want Jesus killed.

According to Ehrman, Jesus taught that a coming kingdom was everyone's proper focus, not anything in this life. He taught about the Jewish Law, seeking its true meaning, sometimes in opposition to other traditions. Jesus put love at the center of the Law, and following that Law was an apocalyptic necessity. His ethical teachings called for forgiveness, not judging others, loving enemies, and caring for the poor. Funk and Hoover note that typical of Jesus were paradoxical or surprising turns of phrase, such as advising one, when struck on the cheek, to offer the other cheek to be struck as well.

The Gospels portray Jesus teaching in well-defined sessions, such as the Sermon on the Mount in the Gospel of Matthew or the parallel Sermon on the Plain in Luke. According to Gerd Theissen and Annette Merz, these teaching sessions include authentic teachings of Jesus, but the scenes were invented by the respective evangelists to frame these teachings, which had originally been recorded without context. While Jesus' miracles fit within the social context of antiquity, he defined them differently. First, he attributed them to the faith of those healed. Second, he connected them to end times prophecy.

Jesus chose twelve disciples (the "Twelve"), evidently as an apocalyptic message. All three Synoptics mention the Twelve, although the names on Luke's list vary from those in Mark and Matthew, suggesting that Christians were not certain who all the disciples were. The twelve disciples might have represented the twelve original tribes of Israel, which would be restored once God's rule was instituted. The disciples were reportedly meant to be the rulers of the tribes in the coming Kingdom. According to Bart Ehrman, Jesus' promise that the Twelve would rule is historical, because the Twelve included Judas Iscariot. In Ehrman's view, no Christians would have invented a line from Jesus, promising rulership to the disciple who betrayed him.
In Mark, the disciples play hardly any role other than a negative one. While others sometimes respond to Jesus with complete faith, his disciples are puzzled and doubtful. They serve as a foil to Jesus and to other characters. The failings of the disciples are probably exaggerated in Mark, and the disciples make a better showing in Matthew and Luke.

Sanders says that Jesus' mission was not about repentance, although he acknowledges that this opinion is unpopular. He argues that repentance appears as a strong theme only in Luke, that repentance was John the Baptist's message, and that Jesus' ministry would not have been scandalous if the sinners he ate with had been repentant. According to Theissen and Merz, Jesus taught that God was generously giving people an opportunity to repent.

Role
Jesus taught that an apocalyptic figure, the "Son of Man", would soon come on clouds of glory to gather the elect, or chosen ones. He referred to himself as a "son of man" in the colloquial sense of "a person", but scholars do not know whether he also meant himself when he referred to the heavenly "Son of Man". Paul the Apostle and other early Christians interpreted the "Son of Man" as the risen Jesus.

The Gospels refer to Jesus not only as a messiah but in the absolute form as "the Messiah" or, equivalently, "the Christ". In early Judaism, this absolute form of the title is not found, but only phrases such as "his messiah". The tradition is ambiguous enough to leave room for debate as to whether Jesus defined his eschatological role as that of the messiah. The Jewish messianic tradition included many different forms, some of them focused on a messiah figure and others not. Based on the Christian tradition, Gerd Theissen advances the hypothesis that Jesus saw himself in messianic terms but did not claim the title "Messiah". Bart Ehrman argues that Jesus did consider himself to be the messiah, albeit in the sense that he would be the king of the new political order that God would usher in, not in the sense that most people today think of the term.

Passover and crucifixion in Jerusalem
Around AD 30, Jesus and his followers traveled from Galilee to Jerusalem to observe Passover. Jesus caused a disturbance in the Second Temple, which was the center of Jewish religious and civil authority. Sanders associates it with Jesus' prophecy that the Temple would be totally demolished. Jesus held a last meal with his disciples, which is the origin of the Sacrament of the Holy Eucharist. His words as recorded in the Synoptic gospels and Paul's First Letter to the Corinthians do not entirely agree, but this meal appears to have pointed to Jesus' place in the coming Kingdom of God when very probably Jesus knew he was about to be killed, although he may have still hoped that God might yet intervene.

The Gospels say that Jesus was betrayed to the authorities by a disciple, and many scholars consider this report to be highly reliable. He was executed on the orders of Pontius Pilate, the Roman prefect of Judaea. Pilate most likely saw Jesus' reference to the Kingdom of God as a threat to Roman authority and worked with the Temple elites to have Jesus executed. The Sadducean high-priestly leaders of the Temple more plausibly had Jesus executed for political reasons than for his teaching. They may have regarded him as a threat to stability, especially after he caused a disturbance at the Second Temple. Other factors, such as Jesus' triumphal entry into Jerusalem, may have contributed to this decision. Most scholars consider Jesus' crucifixion to be factual, because early Christians would not have invented the painful death of their leader.

After crucifixion

After Jesus' death, his followers said he was restored to life, although exact details of their experiences are unclear. The gospel reports contradict each other, possibly suggesting competition among those claiming to have seen him first rather than deliberate fraud. On the other hand, L. Michael White suggests that inconsistencies in the Gospels reflect differences in the agendas of their unknown authors. The followers of Jesus formed a community to wait for his return and the founding of his kingdom.

Portraits of Jesus

Modern research on the historical Jesus has not led to a unified picture of the historical figure, partly because of the variety of academic traditions represented by the scholars. Given the scarcity of historical sources, it is generally difficult for any scholar to construct a portrait of Jesus that can be considered historically valid beyond the basic elements of his life. The portraits of Jesus constructed in these quests often differ from each other, and from the image portrayed in the Gospels.

Jesus is seen as the founder of, in the words of Sanders, a "renewal movement within Judaism". One of the criteria used to discern historical details in the "third quest" is the criterion of plausibility, relative to Jesus' Jewish context and to his influence on Christianity. A disagreement in contemporary research is whether Jesus was apocalyptic. Most scholars conclude that he was an apocalyptic preacher, like John the Baptist and Paul the Apostle. In contrast, certain prominent North American scholars, such as Burton Mack and John Dominic Crossan, advocate for a non-eschatological Jesus, one who is more of a Cynic sage than an apocalyptic preacher. In addition to portraying Jesus as an apocalyptic prophet, a charismatic healer or a cynic philosopher, some scholars portray him as the true messiah or an egalitarian prophet of social change. However, the attributes described in the portraits sometimes overlap, and scholars who differ on some attributes sometimes agree on others.

Since the 18th century, scholars have occasionally put forth that Jesus was a political national messiah, but the evidence for this portrait is negligible. Likewise, the proposal that Jesus was a Zealot does not fit with the earliest strata of the Synoptic tradition.

Language, ethnicity, and appearance

Jesus grew up in Galilee and much of his ministry took place there. The languages spoken in Galilee and Judea during the 1st century AD include Jewish Palestinian Aramaic, Hebrew, and Greek, with Aramaic being predominant. There is substantial consensus that Jesus gave most of his teachings in Aramaic in the Galilean dialect.

Modern scholars agree that Jesus was a Jew of 1st-century Palestine. Ioudaios in New Testament Greek is a term which in the contemporary context may refer to religion (Second Temple Judaism), ethnicity (of Judea), or both. In a review of the state of modern scholarship, Amy-Jill Levine writes that the entire question of ethnicity is "fraught with difficulty", and that "beyond recognizing that 'Jesus was Jewish', rarely does the scholarship address what being 'Jewish' means".

The New Testament gives no description of the physical appearance of Jesus before his death—it is generally indifferent to racial appearances and does not refer to the features of the people it mentions. He also likely had a beard that was not particularly long or heavy. His clothing may have suggested poverty consisting of a mantle (shawl) with tassels, a knee-length basic tunic and sandals.

Christ myth theory

The Christ myth theory is the hypothesis that Jesus of Nazareth never existed; or if he did, that he had virtually nothing to do with the founding of Christianity and the accounts in the gospels. Stories of Jesus' birth, along with other key events, have so many mythic elements that some scholars have suggested that Jesus himself was a myth.
Bruno Bauer (1809–1882) taught that the first Gospel was a work of literature that produced history rather than described it.
According to Albert Kalthoff (1850–1906), a social movement produced Jesus when it encountered Jewish messianic expectations.
Arthur Drews (1865–1935) saw Jesus as the concrete form of a myth that predated Christianity.

Despite arguments put forward by authors who have questioned the existence of a historical Jesus, virtually all scholars of antiquity accept that Jesus was a historical figure and consider Christ Myth Theory fringe.

Perspectives

Apart from his own disciples and followers, the Jews of Jesus' day generally rejected him as the messiah, as do the great majority of Jews today. Christian theologians, ecumenical councils, reformers and others have written extensively about Jesus over the centuries. Christian sects and schisms have often been defined or characterized by their descriptions of Jesus. Meanwhile, Manichaeans, Gnostics, Muslims, Druzes, the Baháʼí Faith, and others, have found prominent places for Jesus in their religions.

Christian

Jesus is the central figure of Christianity. Although Christian views of Jesus vary, it is possible to summarize the key beliefs shared among major denominations, as stated in their catechetical or confessional texts. Christian views of Jesus are derived from various sources, including the canonical gospels and New Testament letters such as the Pauline epistles and the Johannine writings. These documents outline the key beliefs held by Christians about Jesus, including his divinity, humanity, and earthly life, and that he is the Christ and the Son of God. Despite their many shared beliefs, not all Christian denominations agree on all doctrines, and both major and minor differences on teachings and beliefs have persisted throughout Christianity for centuries.

The New Testament states that the resurrection of Jesus is the foundation of the Christian faith. Christians believe that through his sacrificial death and resurrection, humans can be reconciled with God and are thereby offered salvation and the promise of eternal life. Recalling the words of John the Baptist on the day after Jesus' baptism, these doctrines sometimes refer to Jesus as the Lamb of God, who was crucified to fulfill his role as the servant of God. Jesus is thus seen as the new and last Adam, whose obedience contrasts with Adam's disobedience. Christians view Jesus as a role model, whose God-focused life believers are encouraged to imitate.

At present, most Christians believe that Jesus is both human and the Son of God. While there has been theological debate over his nature, Trinitarian Christians generally believe that Jesus is the Logos, God's incarnation and God the Son, both fully divine and fully human. However, the doctrine of the Trinity is not universally accepted among Christians. With the Reformation, Christians such as Michael Servetus and the Socinians started questioning the ancient creeds that had established Jesus' two natures. Nontrinitarian Christian groups include the Church of Jesus Christ of Latter-day Saints, Unitarians and Jehovah's Witnesses.

Christians revere not only Jesus himself, but also his name. Devotions to the Holy Name of Jesus go back to the earliest days of Christianity. These devotions and feasts exist in both Eastern and Western Christianity.

Jewish

Judaism rejects the idea of Jesus (or any future Jewish messiah) being God, or a mediator to God, or part of a Trinity. It holds that Jesus is not the messiah, arguing that he neither fulfilled the Messianic prophecies in the Tanakh nor embodied the personal qualifications of the Messiah. Jews argue that Jesus did not fulfill prophesies to build the Third Temple, gather Jews back to Israel, bring world peace, and unite humanity under the God of Israel. Furthermore, according to Jewish tradition, there were no prophets after Malachi, who delivered his prophesies in the 5th century BC.

Judaic criticism of Jesus is long-standing, and includes a range of stories in the Talmud, written and compiled from the 3rd to the 5th century AD. In one such story, Yeshu HaNozri ("Jesus the Nazarene"), a lewd apostate, is executed by the Jewish high court for spreading idolatry and practicing magic. According to some, the form Yeshu is an acronym which in Hebrew reads: "may his name and memory be blotted out." The majority of contemporary scholars consider that this material provides no information on the historical Jesus. The Mishneh Torah, a late 12th-century work of Jewish law written by Moses Maimonides, states that Jesus is a "stumbling block" who makes "the majority of the world to err and serve a god other than the Lord".

Medieval Hebrew literature contains the anecdotal "Episode of Jesus" (known also as Toledot Yeshu), in which Jesus is described as being the son of Joseph, the son of Pandera (see: Episode of Jesus). The account portrays Jesus as an impostor.

Manichaeism

Manichaeism was the first organised religion outside of Christianity to venerate Jesus. He is considered one of the four prophets, along with Zoroaster, Gautama Buddha and Mani.

Islam

A major figure in Islam, Jesus (often referred to by his Quranic name ) is considered to be a messenger of God and the messiah who was sent to guide the Children of Israel with a new scripture, the Gospel (referred to in Islam as ). Muslims regard the gospels' accounts in the New Testament as partially authentic, and believe that Jesus' original message was altered and that Muhammad came later to revive it. Belief in Jesus (and all other messengers of God) is a requirement for being a Muslim. The Quran mentions Jesus by name 25 times—more often than Muhammad—and emphasizes that Jesus was a mortal human who, like all other prophets, had been divinely chosen to spread God's message. While the Quran affirms the Virgin birth of Jesus, he is considered to be neither an incarnation nor a son of God. Islamic texts emphasize a strict notion of monotheism and forbid the association of partners with God, which would be idolatry. 

The Quran describes the annunciation to Mary by the Holy Spirit that she is to give birth to Jesus while remaining a virgin. It calls the virgin birth a miracle that occurred by the will of God. The Quran (Q21:91 and Q66:12) states that God breathed his spirit into Mary while she was chaste. Jesus is called a "spirit from God" because he was born through the action of the Spirit, but that belief does not imply his pre-existence.

To aid in his ministry to the Jewish people, Jesus was given the ability to perform miracles, by permission of God rather than by his own power. Through his ministry, Jesus is seen as a precursor to Muhammad. In the Quran (Q4:157–159) it is said that Jesus was not killed but was merely made to appear that way to unbelievers, and that he was raised into the heavens while still alive by God. According to most classic Sunni and Twelver Shi'ite interpretations of these verses, the likeness of Jesus was cast upon a substitute (most often one of the apostles), who was crucified in Jesus' stead. However, some medieval Muslims (among others, the  writing under the name of al-Mufaddal ibn Umar al-Ju'fi, the Brethren of Purity, various Isma'ili philosophers, and the Sunni mystic al-Ghazali) affirmed the historicity of Jesus' crucifixion. These thinkers held the docetic view that, although Jesus' human form (his body) had died on the cross, his true divine nature (his spirit) had survived and ascended into heaven, so that his death was only an appearance. Nevertheless, to Muslims it is the ascension rather than the crucifixion that constitutes a major event in the life of Jesus. There is no mention of his resurrection on the third day, and his death plays no special role in Islamic theories of salvation. However, Jesus is a central figure in Islamic eschatology: Muslims believe that he will return to Earth at the end of time and defeat the Antichrist (ad-Dajjal) by killing him.

According to the Quran, the coming of Muhammad was predicted by Jesus: "And remember, Jesus, the son of Mary, said: 'O children of Israel! I am God's messenger to you, confirming the law (which came) before me, and giving glad tidings of a messenger to come after me, whose name shall be Ahmad'" (Quran 61:6). Through this verse, early Arab Muslims claimed legitimacy for their new faith in the existing religious traditions and the alleged predictions of Jesus.

Isma'ili faith 
According to Qadi al-Nu'man, a famous Muslim jurist of the Fatimid period, Jesus is referred to as the messiah in the Quran because he was sent to the people who responded to him in order to remove (masaḥa) their impurities, the ailments of their faith; whether apparent or hidden. Qadi al-Nu'man, in his work Foundation of Symbolic Interpretation, talks about the spiritual birth of Jesus, as an interpretation of his story of physical birth mentioned in the Quran. He says that Mary, the mother of Jesus, is a metaphor for someone who nurtured and instructed Jesus, rather than physically giving birth to him. Qadi al-Nu'man explains that Jesus was from the pure progeny of Abraham, just as Ali and his sons were from the pure progeny of Muhammad, through Fatima.

Ahmadiyya Islam

The Ahmadiyya Muslim Community has several distinct teachings about Jesus. Ahmadis believe that he was a mortal man who survived his crucifixion and died a natural death at the age of 120 in Kashmir, India, and is buried at Roza Bal.

Druze faith

In the Druze faith, Jesus is considered the Messiah and one of God's important prophets, being among the seven prophets who appeared in different periods of history. The Druze venerate Jesus "the son of Joseph and Mary" and his four disciples, who wrote the Gospels. In the Druze tradition, Jesus is known under three titles: the True Messiah (al-Masih al-Haq), the Messiah of all Nations (Masih al-Umam), and the Messiah of Sinners. This is due, respectively, to the belief that Jesus delivered the true Gospel message, the belief that he was the Saviour of all nations, and the belief that he offers forgiveness.

According to the Druze manuscripts Jesus is the Greatest Imam and the incarnation of Ultimate Reason (Akl) on earth and the first cosmic principle (Hadd), and regards Jesus and Hamza ibn Ali as the incarnations of one of the five great celestial powers, who form part of their system. Druze believe that Hamza ibn Ali was a reincarnation of Jesus, and that Hamza ibn Ali is the true Messiah, who directed the deeds of the messiah Jesus "the son of Joseph and Mary", but when Jesus "the son of Joseph and Mary" strayed from the path of the true Messiah, Hamza filled the hearts of the Jews with hatred for him - and for that reason, they crucified him, according to the Druze manuscripts. Despite this, Hamza ibn Ali took him down from the cross and allowed him to return to his family, in order to prepare men for the preaching of his religion.

In an epistle ascribed to one of the founders of Druzism, Baha al-Din al-Muqtana, probably written sometime between AD 1027 and AD 1042, accused the Jews of crucifying Jesus.

Baháʼí faith
The teaching of the Baháʼí Faith consider Jesus to be a manifestation of God, a Baháʼí concept for prophets—intermediaries between God and humanity, serving as messengers and reflecting God's qualities and attributes. The Bahá'í concept emphasizes the simultaneous qualities of humanity and divinity; thus, it is similar to the Christian concept of incarnation. Bahá'í thought accepts Jesus as the Son of God. In Baháʼí thought, Jesus was a perfect incarnation of God's attributes, but Baháʼí teachings reject the idea that "ineffable essence" of the Divinity was contained within a single human body because of their beliefs regarding "omnipresence and transcendence of the essence of God".

Bahá'u'lláh, the founder of the Baháʼí Faith, wrote that since each manifestation of God has the same divine attributes, they can be seen as the spiritual "return" of all previous manifestations of God, and the appearance of each new manifestation of God inaugurates a religion that supersedes the former ones, a concept known as progressive revelation. Baháʼís believe that God's plan unfolds gradually through this process as mankind matures, and that some of the manifestations arrive in specific fulfillment of the missions of previous ones. Thus, Baháʼís believe that Bahá'u'lláh is the promised return of Christ. Baháʼí teachings confirm many, but not all, aspects of Jesus as portrayed in the Gospels. Baháʼís believe in the virgin birth and in the Crucifixion, but see the Resurrection and the miracles of Jesus as symbolic.

Other

In Christian Gnosticism (now a largely extinct religious movement), Jesus was sent from the divine realm and provided the secret knowledge (gnosis) necessary for salvation. Most Gnostics believed that Jesus was a human who became possessed by the spirit of "the Christ" at his baptism. This spirit left Jesus' body during the crucifixion, but was rejoined to him when he was raised from the dead. Some Gnostics, however, were docetics, believed that Jesus did not have a physical body, but only appeared to possess one.

Some Hindus consider Jesus to be an avatar or a sadhu. Paramahansa Yogananda, an Indian guru, taught that Jesus was the reincarnation of Elisha and a student of John the Baptist, the reincarnation of Elijah. Some Buddhists, including Tenzin Gyatso, the 14th Dalai Lama, regard Jesus as a bodhisattva who dedicated his life to the welfare of people. The New Age movement entertains a wide variety of views on Jesus. Theosophists, from whom many New Age teachings originated, refer to Jesus as the Master Jesus, a spiritual reformer, and they believe that Christ, after various incarnations, occupied the body of Jesus. The Urantia Book teaches Jesus is one of more than 700,000 heavenly sons of God. Antony Theodore in the book Jesus Christ in Love writes that there is an underlying oneness of Jesus' teachings with the messages contained in Quran, Vedas, Upanishads, Talmud and Avesta. Atheists reject Jesus' divinity, but have different views about him – from challenging his mental health to emphasizing his "moral superiority" (Richard Dawkins).

Artistic depictions

Some of the earliest depictions of Jesus at the Dura-Europos church are firmly dated to before 256. Thereafter, despite the lack of biblical references or historical records, a wide range of depictions of Jesus appeared during the last two millennia, often influenced by cultural settings, political circumstances and theological contexts. As in other Early Christian art, the earliest depictions date to the late 2nd or early 3rd century, and surviving images are found especially in the Catacombs of Rome.

The depiction of Christ in pictorial form was highly controversial in the early Church. From the 5th century onward, flat painted icons became popular in the Eastern Church. The Byzantine Iconoclasm acted as a barrier to developments in the East, but by the 9th century, art was permitted again. The Protestant Reformation brought renewed resistance to imagery, but total prohibition was atypical, and Protestant objections to images have tended to reduce since the 16th century. Although large images are generally avoided, few Protestants now object to book illustrations depicting Jesus. The use of depictions of Jesus is advocated by the leaders of denominations such as Anglicans and Catholics and is a key element of the Eastern Orthodox tradition.

The Transfiguration was a major theme in Eastern Christian art, and every Eastern Orthodox monk who had trained in icon painting had to prove his craft by painting an icon depicting it. Icons receive the external marks of veneration, such as kisses and prostration, and they are thought to be powerful channels of divine grace. The Renaissance brought forth a number of artists who focused on depictions of Jesus; Fra Angelico and others followed Giotto in the systematic development of uncluttered images.

Before the Protestant Reformation, the crucifix was common in Western Christianity. It is a model of the cross with Jesus crucified on it. The crucifix became the central ornament of the altar in the 13th century, a use that has been nearly universal in Roman Catholic churches since then.

Jesus appears as an infant in a manger (feed trough) in Christmas creches, which depict the Nativity scene. He is typically joined by Mary, Joseph, animals, shepherds, angels, and the Magi. Francis of Assisi (1181/82–1226) is credited with popularizing the creche, although he probably did not initiate it. The creche reached its height of popularity in the 17th and 18th centuries in southern Europe.

Associated relics

The total destruction that ensued with the siege of Jerusalem by the Romans in AD 70 made the survival of items from 1st-century Judea very rare and almost no direct records survive about the history of Judaism from the last part of the 1st century through the 2nd century. Margaret M. Mitchell writes that although Eusebius reports (Ecclesiastical History III 5.3) that the early Christians left Jerusalem for Pella just before Jerusalem was subjected to the final lockdown, we must accept that no first-hand Christian items from the early Jerusalem Church have reached us. Joe Nickell writes, "as investigation after investigation has shown, not a single, reliably authenticated relic of Jesus exists."

However, throughout the history of Christianity, a number of relics attributed to Jesus have been claimed, although doubt has been cast on them. The 16th-century Catholic theologian Erasmus wrote sarcastically about the proliferation of relics and the number of buildings that could have been constructed from the wood claimed to be from the cross used in the Crucifixion. Similarly, while experts debate whether Jesus was crucified with three nails or with four, at least thirty holy nails continue to be venerated as relics across Europe.

Some relics, such as purported remnants of the crown of thorns placed on the head of Jesus, receive only a modest number of pilgrims, while the Shroud of Turin (which is associated with an approved Catholic devotion to the Holy Face of Jesus), has received millions, including popes John Paul II and Benedict XVI.

See also

Notes

References

Citations

Sources

External links

Complete Sayings of Jesus Christ in parallel Latin and English

0s BC births
30s deaths
1st-century apocalypticists
1st-century BCE Jews
1st-century executions
1st-century Jews
1st-century rabbis
Angelic visionaries
Carpenters
Creator gods
Deified people
Exorcists
Faith healers
Founders of religions
God in Christianity
 
Jewish messiah claimants
Judean people
Life-death-rebirth gods
Names of God
People considered avatars by their followers
People executed by crucifixion
People executed by the Roman Empire
People from Bethlehem
People from Nazareth
Prophets of the New Testament
Prophets in the Druze faith
Publicly executed people
Rabbis of the Land of Israel
Savior gods
Simple living advocates
Torture victims
Miracle workers
Year of birth uncertain
Year of death uncertain